General Elections were held in North-West Frontier Province on Monday 7 December 1970 to elect 19 Members of 5th National Assembly of Pakistan. Out of 19 National Assembly seats 18 were General seats and 1 was reserved for woman.

Pakistan Muslim League Qayyum emerged as the largest party in North-West Frontier Province  by winning 7 seats. Jamiat Ulema-e-Islam (West Pakistan) became 2nd largest party by winning 6 seats. Pakistan People's Party and Jamat-e-Islami won 1 seats each. Pakistan Muslim League Qayyum won 1 Reserved seat for Woman.

Result

By constituency 

Pakistan
General
General elections in Pakistan